Parokya ni Edgar (lit: Edgar's Parish) is a Filipino band formed in 1993, composed of Chito Miranda (lead vocals), Gab Chee Kee (rhythm guitar, vocals), Buwi Meneses (bass guitar), Darius Semaña (lead guitar), Dindin Moreno (drums, percussion), and Vinci Montaner (backing vocals). The band is known for its original rock novelty songs and often satirical covers of popular songs both foreign and local. The band is adept at playing in various musical genres.

Parokya ni Edgar has been referred to by local media outlets and numerous award-giving bodies as "Pambansang Banda ng Pilipinas" ("The National Band of the Philippines").

Despite having "Edgar" in the band's name, none of the members are named Edgar.

History

Formation and early years
Originally named Comic Relief, the band's initial members were a group of high school students composed of vocalists Chito Miranda, Jeric Estaco, and Vinci Montaner, along with guitarists Mikko Yap and Gab Chee Kee, all hailing from Ateneo de Manila University. They were regulars in after-school jam sessions, before performing an opening number for an Eraserheads concert. This served as their break in the music industry and prompted them to add a drummer and bassist – Ateneo schoolmate Dindin Moreno and Miranda's childhood friend Buwi Meneses, respectively. Around the same time they changed the band's name to Parokya ni Edgar. After high school, Mikko and Jeric withdrew from the band to pursue other interests. Soon after, the remaining band members invited Darius Semaña, Meneses's former bandmate, to take the role of lead guitar.

Career

Name origin
The band name's origin had been a subject of debate among fans as the band members had never given full confirmation. It was not until 2013 that Chito Miranda officially addressed it through a post on their Facebook page. The title "Parokya Ni Edgar" came from a joke a classmate named Bambi Cuna made during one of their high school classes. Sources state that the class subject was Filipino. When the teacher asked Cuna where Jose Rizal's fictional hero, Crisostomo Ibarra (in the novel Noli Me Tangere) was educated, it was said that Cuna made up a daft answer, "sa Parokya ni Edgar". Then-vocalist Jeric Estaco decided on impromptu to introduce the band as "Parokya ni Edgar" in their first live performance. From there, the band name just stuck.

Mainstream
By the late 1990s, PNE became regular performers in Club Dredd, a popular club in Manila at the time. The band slowly gained popularity during the height of the Filipino rock explosion, with the local rock community welcoming the influence of foreign grunge acts such as Nirvana, Pearl Jam and Soundgarden.

Parokya Ni Edgar won their "Best New Artists Award Winner in the 3rd NU 107 Rock Awards in 1996, the same year, they performed in an awards night since becoming an amateur OPM rock band in pinoy rock history, years later, PNE won 8 times overall in the NU Rock awards until 2003.

Eventually, the late managing director of Universal Records, Bella Dy Tan, signed them as contract artists after witnessing one of their Club Dredd performances.

Soon, their initial recordings "Buloy", "Trip (Siopao Na Special)" and "Lutong Bahay (Cooking Ng Ina Mo)" gained radio airplay. Their first album, Khangkhungkherrnitz (1996) became a triple platinum hit in the Philippines, having sold 120,000 units. The next albums were equal successes - Buruguduystunstugudunstuy (1997) was awarded triple platinum, Jingle Balls Silent Night Holy Cow (1998) with gold, and Gulong Itlog Gulong (1999) with triple platinum. This included the single "Halaga", one of the most popular songs of the band. "Halaga" was such a hit in the country that it further boosted PNE's career, cementing their name in the OPM scene.

In 1999, 2 years after Eraserheads won as Best Southeast Asian Music Video Award Winner for "Ang Huling El Bimbo" in 1997, Parokya won as Best Southeast Asian Music Video Award Moon Man Winner for the music video "Harana" in the MTV Music Video Music Awards 1999 which was held in New York City. Parokya was the second OPM rock band & last MTV Music Video Awards Winner of the Moon Man Trophy after Eraserheads, while in 2001, Kyla won as the last Filipino OPM Performer to win the MTV Award on her entry for the music video "Hanggang Ngayon". The same year, Parokya became popular on television and radio guestings.

After a four-year hiatus, they released their junior studio album Edgar Edgar Musikahan in 2002.

On July 14, 2003, they released the studio album Bigotilyo, with the main single "Mr. Suave". "Mr. Suave" proved to be just as popular as its predecessors and stayed on the music charts for more than a year. The song became so popular in the Philippines that a few commercials and political campaigns borrowed stanzas from it. In the same year of 2003, Parokya celebrated their 10th Year Anniversary with gigs and concerts in various shows nationwide and internationally like Hong Kong, and Canadian provinces such as Alberta, British Columbia, and Ontario. They also toured in the United States specifically in New York, New Jersey, Hawaii, Arizona, and California.

In 2004, the band released Inuman Sessions Vol. 1, PNE's first compilation DVD album celebrating their 11th anniversary. The DVD showcased the band's prerecorded live studio performance of their hit songs to a selected audience. The DVD album was met with commercial success nationwide.

They released their 8th studio album, Middle-Aged Juvenile Novelty Pop Rockers in 2010 with the single "Paki-usap Lang (Lasingin Nyo Ako)". The album was met with moderate success in both charts and sales.

In 2011, PNE joined the roster of Tanduay's First Five and RockFest replacing long running Tanduay endorser 6cyclemind.

The following year, PNE released their second compilation DVD album Inuman Sessions Vol. 2 - a follow up to their Inuman Sessions Vol. 1. Later that same year, Montaner officially left the band on good terms with both the members and crew.

2013 marked PNE's 20th anniversary in the OPM industry. The band launched their 13th album Bente as commemoration, and as this was a milestone, Vinci Montaner temporarily reunited with the band for the album's cover art and signings.

In 2014, PNE was awarded with the MYX Magna Award for their artistic contribution to OPM Rock History & also celebrating their 20th anniversary in the OPM rock scene from the mid 1990s. They are the second OPM rock band to receive this award after Eraserheads in 2009.

All throughout 2015, the band toured selected cities in the United States; they headlined at the Landmark Loews Theater in Jersey City, New Jersey on March 21, 2015. That same year, the band began recording for their next album and contained the tracks "Sing" and "Lagi Mong Tatandaan", the former featuring Rico Blanco. Their 9th studio album and their 14th overall album is entitled Pogi Years Old. The cover album was revealed on September 2, 2016 through their Facebook page and expected to be released by 2016. Former member Vinci Montaner was said to appear on the album as a featured artist. On September 9, 2016, the band held a free surprise show at the Bonifacio Shrine in Manila. The album was released on October 17, 2016 nationwide and on digital format. The band would held an album launch at Eastwood Central Plaza on October 16, 2016. This marks the return of Vinci Montaner, who would join permanently days later.

On November 22, 2017, Parokya was named as the newest celebrity music star inductee in the 2017 Eastwood City Walk of Fame in Eastwood City Mall Quezon City for their influence in Pinoy rock music. Parokya was the third related music group and first OPM rock band to be inducted to the Eastwood City Walk Of Fame.

Parokya Ni Edgar also celebrated their 25th silver anniversary in October 2018 following with more concerts and gigs.

A musical adaptation of Parokya Ni Edgar's discography in cooperation with longest running gag comedy show Bubble Gang entitled Bubble Gang Parokya Na To: A Laugh Story The Musical was recently performed last February 15, 2019 at Waterfront Hotel Cebu City, produced by GMA Kapuso Concerts. This was Parokya's 1st musical stage play and also the 4th OPM music artist overall for musical staging play after Eraserheads "Ang Huling El Bimbo" in 2015, Apo Hiking Society's "Eto Na: Musical nAPO" in 2017, and Aegis's "Rak of Aegis: The Musical" in 2018.

The band also performed for their 25th silver anniversary concert in the U.S. & Canada Tour entitled Parokya 25 Live In The U.S. & Canada in March 2019.

As of 2020, Parokya is still active with more gigs and is scheduled to release their new single together with the band Kamikazee. The same year, PNE releases a new single, "Pati Pato", with Gloc9 and Shanti Dope, was released in July 2020. PNE had also released a single for Chito's wife Neri; the song "Smile" was released in October 2020 exclusively on Spotify and later on digital platforms like Deezer, Apple iTunes, and YouTube.

In 2021, Parokya's brand new single, "It's Masarap" was released last January 2021, the song was a parody inspired from the longest running noon time variety show, "Eat Bulaga!", plus their official music video was also released on YouTube also the same month. Also in 2021, Parokya released their brand new album called Borbolen, their 10th studio album and also their 15th overall album and for the first time after 5 years since Pogi Years Old released in 2016.

In 2022, Parokya launched their 1st Vinyl Record for their original release of 1996 album, "Khangkhungkherrnitz" is currently available and the re released LP was launched last February 17, 2022.

Activism
Parokya joined PETA's Free Mali campaign in 2013. "Mali has been sentenced to a miserable life of solitary confinement with absolutely nothing to do day after day, year after year", says lead vocalist Chito Miranda. Scientists, politicians, religious leaders, and tens of thousands of other concerned people have joined PETA in calling for Mali to be freed. "We in Parokya ni Edgar do, too. Even if the elephant exhibit at the Manila Zoo were to be doubled or tripled in size, it would still not be adequate to house one elephant, never mind additional ones. While zoos around the world have spent upwards of 2 billion pesos on attempts at more appropriately sized elephant exhibits, more and more zoos have recognized that the needs of these complex and intelligent animals cannot be met in captivity".

Band members
Current members
 Chito Miranda – lead vocals (1993–present)
 Gab Chee Kee – rhythm guitar, vocals (1993–present)
 Buwi Meneses – bass guitar (1993–present; currently on hiatus/part-time since 2015)
 Darius Semaña – lead guitar (1993–present)
 Dindin Moreno – drums, percussion (1993–present)
 Vinci Montaner – backing vocals, monologue, live vocal ad-libs, occasional percussion (1993–2012, 2016–present; currently on hiatus)

Touring and session members 
 Paolo Bernaldo (of Moonstar88) – bass guitar (2015–present)

Discography

Albums

Studio albums
 Khangkhungkherrnitz (1996)
 Buruguduystunstugudunstuy (1997)
 Gulong Itlog Gulong (1999)
 Edgar, Edgar Musikahan (2002)
 Bigotilyo (2003)
 Halina Sa Parokya (2005)
 Solid (2007)
 Middle-Aged Juvenile Novelty Pop Rockers (2010)
 Pogi Years Old (2016)
 Borbolen (2021)

Christmas albums
 Jingle Balls Silent Night Holy Cow (1998)

Compilation albums
 Matira Matibay: PG-13 (Singles 1994-2007) (2007)
 Bente (2013)

Live albums
 Inuman Sessions Vol. 1 (2004)
 Inuman Sessions Vol. 2 (2012)

DVDs
 Inuman Sessions VOL.1 DVD (2004)
 Matira Matibay: PG-13 ("Singles 1994-2007") DVD (2007)
 Inuman Sessions VOL.2 DVD (2012)
 Bente: Parokya Ni Edgar 20th Anniversary DVD (2013)

Collaborative album appearances
 Akustic Natin (Universal Records, 2004)
 Akustic Natin Vol. 2 (Universal Records, 2004)
 The Best of OPM Acoustic Hits (Universal Records, 2005)
 The Best of OPM Love Ballads (Universal Records, 2005)
 Pinoy Ako (Star Music, 2005)
 OPM Superstars Christmas (Universal Records, 2005)
 Superbands (Universal Records, 2005)
 Kami nAPO muna (Universal Records, 2006)
 OPM Gold Christmas Album (Universal Records, 2006)
 The Biggest OPM Hits of The Year SUPER (Universal Records, 2006)
 Bandang Pinoy, Lasang Hotdog (Sony Music Philippines, Repackaged 2006)
 Kami nAPO muna ulit (Universal Records, 2007)
 Pinoy Biggie Hits Rewind (Star Music, 2007)
 Level Up: The Album (Star Music, 2007)
 OPM Platinum Christmas (Universal Records, 2007)
 Another Biggest OPM Hits of The Year SUPER 2 (Universal Records, 2007)
 Pinoy Biggie Hits Vol. 3 (Star Music, 2007)
 Astig...The Biggest Band Hits (Universal Records, 2008)
 Harana: OPM's Biggest Hits In Guitar (Ivory Music, 2009)
 I-Star 15: The Best Of Alternative & Rock Songs (Star Music, 2010)
 OPM All Star Christmas (Universal Records, 2010)
 A Perfectly Acoustic Experience (PolyEast Records, 2011)
 Awit Kapuso: Kay Sarap Maging Kapuso (GMA Music, 2012)
 Super Astig Hits (Universal Records, 2016)

Singles

 1996: "Buloy"
 1996: "Lutong Bahay (Cooking ng Ina Mo)"
 1996: "Tatlong Araw"
 1996: "Maniwala Ka Sana"
 1997: "Silvertoes"
 1997: "Sayang"
 1997: "Harana" (originally composed by Eric Yaptangco and sung by former Smokey Mountain singer and incumbent Finance Undersecretary Tony Lambino; also PNE's 1st cover song and was also covered by APO Hiking Society in 2001)
 1997: "Sampip" (Parokya's 1st English Rock Song)
 1999: "Picha Pie"
 1999: "Halaga"
 1999: "Inuman Na"
 1999: "Oka Tokat" (theme song for the TV series of the same title)
 1999: "Wag Mo Na Sana" (originally composed and performed by Frasco as "Oo Na Mahal Na Kung Mahal Kita")
 2002: "Swimming Beach"
 2002: "Sorry Na"
 2002: "This Guy's in Love with You Pare" (a song of Himig Handog 2002)
 2002: "Beh! Buti Nga!" (cover of the Hotdog song)
 2003: "Mr. Suave"
 2003: "The Yes Yes Show"
 2003: "Alumni Homecoming"
 2004: "Chikinini"
 2004: "Your Song (My One and Only You)"
 2005: "Kaleidoscope World" (cover of the Francis Magalona song, also featuring Magalona)
 2005: "First Day Funk" (commercial ad jingle for Rexona)
 2005: "Mang Jose"
 2005: "Bagsakan" (featuring Francis M and Gloc-9)
 2005: "Para Sa 'Yo"
 2005: "Papa Cologne"
 2005: "The Ordertaker"
 2005: "Gitara"
 2006: "Pumapatak ang Ulan" (cover of the APO Hiking Society song)
 2007: "American Junk" (featuring Kamikazee) (cover of the APO Hiking Society song)
 2007: "Nescafe" (commercial ad jingle for Nescafe)
 2007: "Macho"
 2007: "Boys Do Falling Love" (cover of the Robin Gibb song)
 2007: "Lastikman (Walang Susuko)" (theme song for the TV series of the same title)
 2008: "Akala"
 2008: "Reunion" (an alternate version was used as a commercial ad jingle for Jollibee with the title "Iisang Sarap")
 2010: "I-Bulsarap!" (commercial ad jingle for Mang Tomas All-Around Sarsa)
 2010: "Panday Kids" (theme song for the TV series of the same title)
 2010: "Pakiusap Lang (Lasingin Nyo Ako)"
 2012: "Pangarap Lang Kita" (featuring Happee Sy)
 2013: "One Hit Combo" (featuring Gloc-9)
 2013: "Ang Parokya" (featuring Gloc-9)
 2014: "Salamat Po"
 2015: "Sing" (featuring Rico Blanco)
 2015: "Lagi Mong Tatandaan"
 2016: "Beautiful Girl" (cover of the Jose Mari Chan song)
 2017: "Wala Lang Yun"
 2018: "Friendzone Mo Mukha Mo"
 2020: "Pati Pato" (featuring Gloc-9 & Shanti Dope)
 2020: "Smile"
 2021: "It's Masarap"
 2021: "Borbolen"
 2022: "Rosas"
 2022: "Wag Ka Na"
 2022: "Until Now" (feat. Eunice Jorge of Gracenote)

Parodies and samples
Parokya ni Edgar is also known for parodying songs of famous singers and bands.

 "Trip" - "Creep" by Radiohead
 "Alimango" - "Animal" by Pearl Jam
 "The Crush (Bakit Ang Pangit Pangit Mo?)" - "Should I Stay or Should I Go" by The Clash
 "Papa Cologne" - interpolates "Lança Perfume" by Rita Lee
 "Picha Pie" - "I Will Survive" by Cake (originally by Gloria Gaynor)
 "Chikinini" - "Banal Na Aso, Santong Kabayo" by Yano
 "Nakaw ang Wallet Ko" - "Knockin' on Heaven's Door" by Guns N' Roses (originally by Bob Dylan)
 "The Ordertaker" - a mashup of "Chop Suey" and "Toxicity" by System of a Down
 "Macho" - "Macho Man" by Village People
 "Tange" - "The Popeye Theme"
 "Celfone Wallet" / "Celfone Celfone Wallet" - from the "Seiko Wallet Jingle" by Bing Rodrigo
 "Pedro, Basura Man" - "The Popeye Theme"
 "Bagsakan" - interpolates "Pollux Diving" by Keltscross and the Contra theme song from Base I (Stage 2) and II (Stage 4)
"Mang Jose" - Interpolates the lyrics of the opening theme for Daimos and even referenced the mecha anime in its lyrics.
 "Laging Mong Tatandaan" - interpolates "Pusong Bato" by Aimee Torres
 "It's Masarap" - interpolates "Eat Bulaga"
 "Wag Ka Na" - interpolates "Disney's Camp Rock 2"

Music videos

 Buloy (1996, debut music video)
 Maniwala Ka Sana (1996)
 Silvertoes (1997)
 Harana (1998, 1st Music Video in 16mm & won 2 years later as Best Southeast Asia Music Video in MTV Video Music Awards in New York City in 1999)
 Halaga (1999, parody dance from Backstreet Boys & Blink-182)
 Picha Pie (1999, spoofs Ace Ventura & Tekken 3)
 Inuman Na (1999)
 Swimming Beach (2002, inspired from Survivor reality TV series)
 Sorry Na (2002, inspired from Jane Fonda Aerobics Video)
 This Guy Is In Love With You Pare (2002, a song finalist in Himig Handog P-Pop Love Songs 2002)
 Chikinini (2003)
 Mr. Suave (2003, theme song from a comedy movie of the same title)
 The Yes Yes Show (2003, inspired from a Hip-Hop Music Video)
 First Day Funk (2005, inspired from Rexona)
 Mang Jose (2005, inspired from Batman)
 Para Sa Yo (2005, inspired from PBB Season 1)
 The Ordertaker (2005, parodied from WWE's The Undertaker)
 Papa Cologne (2005, inspired from an AXE Deo Cologne and spoofs Player's Cologne for men ad from 1992)
 Gitara (2005, inspired from a Koreanovela)
 Bagsakan (2006, inspired from a High School theater)
 Macho (2007, inspired from Village People)
 Akala (2007)
 Pakiusap Lang (2010)
 Pangarap Lang Kita (2010, 1st music video in HD)
 One Hit Combo (2010)
 Ang Parokya (2013, inspired from Nirvana's "You Know You're Right")
 Salamat Po (2013)
 Sing (2016)
 Lagi Mong Tatandaan (2016)
 Wala Lang Yun (2018, inspired from a big heads effects & also 1st aired on MYX)
 Friendzone Mo Mukha Mo (2020, Tower Sessions S04E17.1)
 Pati Pato (2020, inspired from an American Rock Band Linkin Park)
 It's Masarap (2021, inspired from a long running noontime show "Eat Bulaga")
 Rosas (2022, 2nd music video in HD)
 Wag Ka Na (2022, parody of Disney's Camp Rock 2's This Is Our Song)
 Until Now "feat. Eunice Jorge of Gracenote" (2022, inspired from MTV Unplugged)

Awards and nominations

Other projects
Parokya ni Edgar band vocalist member Chito Miranda is also an occasional movie actor, starring in his debut movie appearance "Coming Soon" which was released in 2013. Miranda is also an occasional solo artist, having collaborations with Abra, Gloc-9, Maysh Baay of Moonstar88, former Rivermaya frontman Rico Blanco, and Eunice Jorge of Gracenote. Parokya also had collaborations with Francis M and with former Eraserheads frontman Ely Buendia for the single "Hosanna Ngayong Pasko" as part of the band's Christmas album, "Jingle Balls Silent Night Holy Cow" which was released in 1998. Miranda is also a T-shirt brand ambassador endorser of Uniqlo Philippines in 2012 together with former singer-actress Nikki Gil-Albert and other actors and sports personalities. Miranda was also their first solo T-shirt endorser. Miranda has recently endorsed, with wife Neri and his Miggy, for a Bonakid Kids Milk Commercial in 2021. Chito is now the newest judge in a brand new season of Idol Philippines replacing original judge James Reid and comedian Vice Ganda now replaces Gary V. as the newest judge while original Idol PH judges Asia's songbird TV host and actress Regine Velasquez-Alcasid and commercial jingle singer and TV host Moira Dela Torre will return again also in a new season in 2022.

Parokya's backing vocalist Vinci Montaner is also a solo artist and also worked with Pinoy hip hop artist Gloc-9 in 2019. Monataner also covered Jose Mari Chan's iconic signature song, "Beautiful Girl", which was his all-time favorite love song. This cover single becomes a rock ballad cover song and was also part of Parokya's 14th overall album, "Pogi Years Old" released in 2016.

Buwi Meneses is also a commercial endorser for "RJ Guitars" which he had his first solo commercial, playing bass. Meneses is also a former member of the band Franco in 2010, with Franco Reyes.

Paolo Bernaldo is the band's regular touring and session bassist filling in for long time bassist Buwi Meneses who is currently residing in the US. Meneses still plays in the band in US tours and occasional visits in the Philippines. Bernaldo is also a former member of the band Moonstar88 along with Maysh Baay who also had a duet with Parokya lead singer Chito Miranda.

In popular culture and cultural references
 In Inuman Na Music Video, mascots Balawis (Pinoy version of Alien Movie) & Yosi Kadiri (a former mascot of DOH), The Brownbeat All Stars, Keltscross, The Youth, former Barbies Cradle frontgirl Barbie Almabis-Honasan, former Rivermaya frontman Rico Blanco, OPM pop artist Gino Padilla (who samples playing a guitar), and the late comedians Master Showman Kuya Germs and Tado Jimenez are guest in a funny music video released in 1999.
 In Picha Pie Music Video, Chito played as a funny nerdy guy as Jim Carrey of Ace Ventura, their bandmates plays as a fighter boys of Tekken 3 and the late Tado Jimenez plays as Mr. Bean who fell down from the sky.
 In Harana Music Video, the late comedian Tado Jimenez plays as a bald guy with a fly on his head beginning in a parody of "Don't Speak" by No Doubt Band.
 In "Wag Ka Na" Music Video, Parokya Band members with Eunice Jorge of Gracenote Band grilling a marshmallows and hotdogs with a fireplace in a parody of Disney's Camp Rock 2's "This Is Our Song".
 G Toengi was the first female guest appearance in the music video, "Harana".
 Parokya was the first OPM rock band inducted to the Eastwood City Walk Of Fame in 2018, its also similar patterned to the Hollywood Walk Of Fame in Hollywood, California.
 Parokya was the second OPM rock band who were awarded as Best International Southeastern Asian Music Artist winner for the music video "Harana" in the MTV Video Music Awards in New York City, New York in 1999, and also 2 years after Eraserheads won their 1st MTV Video Music Awards Best International Southeast Asian Music Artist Winner for the music video "Ang Huling El Bimbo" released in 1997.
 Parokya was also the second MYX Magna Award Winner in the 9th MYX Music Awards 2014, 5 years after Eraserheads also won the same award category in 2009.
 Parokya's first music video was, "Buloy" and released in 1996 as a debut single and also a debut album, "Khangkhungkherrnitz".
 "Buloy" is a true story about a former FEU Student who died of depression in 1996 and also the late Buloy was posthumously appeared in the music video and become an instant Parokya hit.
 The song "Lutong Bahay (Cooking ng Ina Mo)" is a joke based on a Filipino maternal insult.
 Parokya's first parody music video was "Picha Pie" which parodies "Ace Ventura" played by frontman Chito Miranda and spoofs Tekken 3 with Chito's bandmates as well.
 Parokya's first original English song was "Sampip" in 1997.
 Parokya was the only OPM rock band does have a parody music videos such as "Picha Pie" (Parodies "Ace Ventura" & "Tekken 3", 1999), "Harana" (Parody of "Don't Speak" by No Doubt Band", "Halaga" (Combined Dance parody of "Backstreet Boys" & "Blink 182", 1999), "Swimming Beach" (Parody of "Survivor USA", 2002), "Sorry Na" (parody of "Jane Fonda Aerobics Workout Video", 2002), "The Yes Yes Show" (parody of a Hip Hop Music Video, 2003), "Mr. Suave" (Parody of an R&B Band, 2003), "Para Sa Yo" (Parody of "Pinoy Big Brother", 2005), "Mang Jose" (Parody of "Batman The Movie", 2005), "The Ordertaker" (Parody of "WWE", 2005), "Papa Cologne" (Parody of "Players Cologne For Men" & "AXE Deo For Men" Commercials, 2005), "Gitara" (Parody of "Koreanovela" TV series, 2005), "Macho" (Combined Parody of "Village People" & "Hagibis", 2007), "Pangarap Lang Kita" (Inspired by a Chinatown Music Video, 2010), "Ang Parokya" (Inspired by a music video, "You're Know You're Right" by Nirvana, 2013), "Wala Lang Yon" (Parody of a "Big Head Effects", 2016), "Pati Pato" (Parody of Linking Park, 2020), "It's Masarap" (Parody of a longest running noontime comedy variety program, "Eat Bulaga", 2021), "Wag Ka Na" (parody of Disney's Camp Rock 2's This Is Our Song, 2022) & their latest single, "Until Now" (2022, Inspired by MTV Unplugged).
 Parokya won as Best New Artist in the NU 107 Rock Awards in 1996.
 Parokya's first commercial endorsement was "Chippy" in 1999, 3 years after Eraserheads also did their endorsement in a "Chippy" commercial in 1995.
 Parokya frontman Chito Miranda & Former Eraserheads frontman Ely Buendia both duets in a Christmas single, "Hosanna Ngayong Pasko" from Parokyas 1st Christmas Album, "Jingle Balls Silent Night Holy Cow" in 1998.
 Parokya's first parody cover was "Nakaw Ang Wallet Ko!", a parody cover of "Bob Dylan's Knocking On Heavens Door" which also covered by "Guns N' Roses", the parody cover single was released in 1996.
 Parokya's first cover OPM song was "Harana" original composed and sung by former Smokey Mountain frontman & Finance Undersecretary Tony Lambino in 1997.
 Parokya's first DVD release was Matira Matibay: Parokya's Best 1994–2007.
 Parokya's first Christmas Album was Jingle Balls, Silent Night, Holy Cow was released in 1998.
 Parokya's first live album was Inuman Sessions Vol. 1 in 2004 then a follow up 10 years later an Inuman Sessions Vol. 2 was released in 2014.
 Parokya's first 16mm music video was "Harana" in 1997.
 Parokya's first HD music video was "Pangarap Lang Kita" in 2010.
 Parokya's first parody album cover was inspired by a late 60's and early 70's theme.
 Parokya's first non band music video and also 1st love team music video was "Rosas" with Ronnie Alonte & Loisa Andalio was shot entirely in Marikina City in 2022.
 Parokya's first Vinyl album was a 1996 debut album, "Khangkhungkherrnitz" was re-released on February 17, 2022, and also were the 10th OPM rock band members after Juan Dela Cruz Band, Maria Cafra, Anak Bayan Band, Asin Band, The Dawn, Eraserheads, Rivermaya, Kjwan & Itchyworms also released their vinyl albums as well.
 Parokya is the only OPM rock band that has a free parody version of NBA basketball trading cards inside a cassette tape (1 per random card), inside a CD (complete trading cards and a free limited edition mini 2000 calendar card) "only available on CD" in 1999.
 Parokya is also the only OPM rock band to have a free coloring book inside the CD, released in 2005.
 Parokya's first female guest singer in the 2010 album, "Middle-Aged Juvenile Novelty Pop Rockers" was Happee Sy, 2 years later, Yeng Constantino also covered the song in a live album of PNE in 2014.
 Parokya's first piano single was Panahon Na Naman Ng Harana with former Rivermaya frontman Rico Blanco as plays the piano which the song combines Panahon Na Naman (original composed by Rico Blanco & Original by Rivermaya) and Harana (original composed & sung by former Smokey Mountain Frontman & incumbent Finance Undersecretary Tony Lambino), and it was released in 2016.
 Parokya was the second OPM rock band for creating their limited T-shirts after Eraserheads, Eraserheads also launched their T-shirt designs in 2012, while Parokya also launched their T-shirt designs around 2014.
 Parokya's first T-shirt design was a kaldero typed band designed shirt in 2014, their recent was a debut album "Khangkhungkherrnitz"" design was also launched in 2022.
 Parokya's first parody designed T-shirt was "The Simpsons" designed version in 2020, while their latest design was a Simpson family design shirt now included with former PNE 2nd Frontman Vinci Montaner who played as a Pizza Man mascot (a parody of the Lard Lad Donut Man Mascot Figure) in 2021, recently also in 2021, Parokya had another new batch set of T-shirt designs featuring Japanese Robot Animaes of Mazinger Z, Voltron, Daimos, and their recent robot design shirt was Voltes V. For their 1st Anniversary in 2022, Parokya launched their first hoodie jacket shirt with a new design, a parody version of "He-Man". The "He-Man" parody is also now available on the T-shirt version of Parokya Ni Edgar.

In other media

Commercial endorsements
 AMA Computer University
 Coca-Cola
 Jollibee
 Mang Tomas All Around Sarsa
 Mitsubishi Adventure SUV
 Mountain Dew Soda
 Nescafe Coffee
 Red Horse Beer
 Rexona Deodorant
 San Miguel Beer
 Tanduay Rum
 Touch Mobile (TM)

Magazine cover appearances
 MYX Magazine (2006-2013, 2 times)
 Banda Song Lyrics Magazine (2000–present, 15 times)
 Pulp Magazine Philippines (1997–2012, 15 times)
 Fudge Magazine (2004–2010, 5 times)
 FWD Magazine (2001, 1 time)

Notes

References

Filipino rock music groups
Universal Records (Philippines) artists
Musical groups established in 1993
1993 establishments in the Philippines
Comedy rock musical groups
Musical groups from Quezon City